Błota may refer to:

 Błota, Sieradz County
 Błota, Kutno County
 Spreewald - Błota in Sorbian
Błota, Greater Poland Voivodeship (west-central Poland)
Błota, Opole Voivodeship (south-west Poland)